Ismaïl Ayoune (born 15 April 1987) is a Moroccan road cyclist. He rode at the 2013 UCI Road World Championships.

Major results

2010
 Les Challenges de la Marche Verte
3rd GP Al Massira
5th GP Sakia El Hamra
7th GP Oued Ed-Dahab
 10th Overall Tour of Libya
2011
 3rd National Time Trial Championships
 Challenge des phosphates
6th Challenge Ben Guerir
8th Challenge Youssoufia
 9th Overall Tour du Maroc
2012
 Les Challenges de la Marche Verte
1st GP Al Massira
10th GP Sakia El Hamra
 3rd Circuit d'Alger
 Challenge du Prince
8th Trophée de la Maison Royale
10th Trophée de l'Anniversaire
2013
 Les Challenges de la Marche Verte
1st GP Al Massira
2nd GP Oued Ed-Dahab
6th GP Sakia El Hamra
 3rd National Time Trial Championships
 6th Overall Tour de Tipaza
 9th Circuit d'Alger
 9th Trophée Princier, Challenge du Prince
2014
 Les Challenges de la Marche Verte
2nd GP Sakia El Hamra
3rd GP Oued Ed-Dahab
 2nd Trophée Princier, Challenge du Prince
 9th Criterium International de Blida

References

External links

1987 births
Living people
Moroccan male cyclists
Place of birth missing (living people)